Aprilia may refer to:

 Aprilia, motorcycle manufacturer
 Gresini Racing, Aprilia MotoGP racing team to 2021
 Aprilia, Lazio, Italian city
 Lancia Aprilia, automobile